Mount Geissel is a mountain,  high, standing  south of Mount Simmons in the Independence Hills of the Heritage Range, Antarctica. It was named by the Advisory Committee on Antarctic Names for Robert H. Geissel, a United States Antarctic Research Program geomagnetist and seismologist at Plateau Station in 1966.

See also
 Mountains in Antarctica

References

Mountains of Ellsworth Land